Zensational (foaled April 26, 2006) is an American Thoroughbred racehorse best known for his performances over sprint distances.

Background
Zensational is a gray or roan colt, bred in Kentucky. He was sired by Unbridled's Song out of the Phone Trick mare Joke. Like her son, Joke was also a speedster, winning the Vallejo Stakes. Zensational's dam Joke was a stakes winner and she is a half-sister to the stakes winners Trip (Lord at War) and Laity (Pulpit).

A $700,00 yearling purchase at the Fasig-Tipton Florida select sale of 2-year-olds in training in 2008, Zensational was bred by Claiborne Farm in Kentucky.

Racing career 

Owned by Zayat Stables, trained by Bob Baffert and ridden by Garrett K. Gomez, the Roan almost Gray Colt swept all three major sprints in Southern California in the summer of 2009, beating older horses in the Triple Bend Handicap, then in the Bing Crosby Handicap and the Pat O'Brien Handicap. The victory in the Pat O'Brien Handicap earned Zensational a spot in the BC Sprint on Nov. 7 at Santa Anita's Oak Tree meeting through the Win and You're In.

2009 Breeders Cup Sprint 

Zensational faced a heavy field of sprint horses at their best in the $2 million Sentient Jet Breeders' Cup Sprint at the Oak Tree Meeting at Santa Anita Park. The field included Kentucky Cup Sprint winner, El Brujo, Forego Handicap winner Pyro and winner of the 2009 Ancient Title Stakes going 6 furlongs, Gayego.

Retired following an unplaced finish in the 2009 Breeders' Cup Sprint. Zensational
Entered stud in 2010 at Hill 'N' Dale Farms, Lexington KY.

References
 Zensational information page 
 Pedigree Profile

External links
 http://www.google.com.cu/search?hl=es&q=Zensational+%28horse%29+Photos&meta=

2006 racehorse births
Racehorses bred in Kentucky
Racehorses trained in the United States
Thoroughbred family 13-c